Govind Prasad Kukreti (25 August 1932 – 31 August 2016), popularly known as Dabral Baba, was an Indian yogi and a disciple of Vikrant Bhairav and Mahavatar Babaji. He was also known as Baba and Shri Dabral Baba. 

Dabral Baba hailed from Ujjain in the state of Madhya Pradesh. He adopted his surname (Dabral) after his maternal uncle's who virtually brought him up at Dhar and later to Ujjain. He was also unusual among Indian yogis who was a householder - he got married, raised a family, worked in Vikram University in Ujjain. Dabral Baba lived with his family at his home (Bhairav Niwas) located in Rishinagar in Ujjain. Dabral Baba attainted substantial enlightenment and earned popularity among highest ranks of yogis in 20th and 21st century period.

In the later part of his life, he was visited by many great saints both physically and spiritually primarily Mahavatar Babaji who took him to his gupha as well. Dabral Baba unveiled Vikrant Bhairav temple in Bhairavgarh, Madhya Pradesh the idol of Vikrant Bhairav was deep buried in mud for years, Dabral Baba was guided to unveil this temple and he later attained enlightenment with the guidance of his guru.

Biography

Early life

Dabral Baba was born at Timli, a village in Pauri Garhwal district in the United Provinces of British India (now in Uttarakhand), India. He spent his childhood at Timli with maternal grandparents and at Kathoor with paternal grandparents. Later he came to Dhar, a district headquarters in Indore Division and to Ujjain, a divisional headquarters in the state of Madhya Pradesh.

Vikrant Bhairav Temple Discovery by Dabral Baba 

Dabral Baba discovered this temple in 1960. He used to meditate at Kal Bhairav and strongly driven by divine impulse he reached to Shipra River to wash his hands. A saint sitting at bank of river told Baba that he was waiting for him told him to walk on north side of river. 
Walking on his own destiny in the jungle around bank of Shipra, on soggy ground he reached to deserted place at a time when darkness was all over, no later Baba stood in front of now known as Vikrant Bhairav idol, deeply covered in mud. He scratched, uncovered hard mud coat and unveiled the idol of current Vikrant Bhairav.
Eventually, the image of Vikrant Bhairav gradually appeared before Dabral Baba who stood with folded hands for some time. He then filled an earthen lamp with oil, lit it, placed a few roses and lighted a bunch of incense sticks. A shudder of awe ran through Dabral Baba who left the mysterious place charged with a feeling of happiness, joy, pleasure and surprise at having reached the place of his dream.

Honor with 'Baba' 
In year 1960, on windy night during Diwali festival. Baba went to light up earthen lamp before the image of Vikrant Bhairavji and immediately left the awe-inspiring solitary place. As air was blowing strongly, he turned back to see if the lamp was still burning and Dabral Babaji was astonished to notice that the whole area was brightly lit up with hundreds of earthen lamps and the image of Vikrant Bhairavji was radiantly shining. It was a terrifying experience for Dabral Babaji who couldn't believe his eyes. He moved fast to the temple of Kaal Bhairav where a person was sitting.

Dabral Babaji narrated him everything and both of them returned to the river bank to witness the same sight. The old man was the first person to touch the feet of Dabral Babaji and addressed him 'BABA'. This enlightening event transformed Dabral Babaji's life altogether. Since that day Dabral Babaji has been worshipping Vikrant Bhairavji with unflinching faith and sincere devotion.

Link with Mahavatar Babaji
In the later year of his life, he revealed, his communion with Mahavatar Babaji, famous known deathless guru as acknowledged in Autobiography of a Yogi , the guru of Lahiri Mahasaya visited him periodically and guiding his journey to the thee, he used to speak less, was childlike in behavior, rarely revealed his spirits. In one communication, he manifested his journey of how Mahavatar babaji took him to his cave to him often take him in his dera (group) to stay forever and often visit to him. He consistently address baba sitting in front of him directly guiding him all time, he claimed there are many other saints including two white foreigners in his group (addressed as Dera by him) he said Mahavatar Babaji quite often travel with his dera and says 'Dera Danda Uthao' meaning group lets leave. Dabral Baba said, when Mahavatar speaks, now one talks you just listen and his picture becomes red, he can speak any language but he address in Hindi all the time.

Mahavatar Babaji spotted in Ujjain (Kumbh 2016) 
First Instance : During Kumbh Mela 2016 in Ujjain, Babaji at his home in Bhairav Niwas asked his disciple to turn on tv while sitting in deep meditation . He pointed his finger on tv, asking his wife and one of his devotee Yogesh to look at live telecast of the Kumbh Snan, he addressed his finger pointing to tv on a very young around 25 years old sadhu taking dip in river Shipra in mid of crowd as shown on tv-channel live feed of Kumbh Snan (Kumbh Mass bath). Yogesh asked ensuring by pointing his finger on tv to young sadhu, Baba said that young boy is Mahavtar Babaji. Dabral baba said, this Sadhu will shake his head (Jata) to wash his hair. Yogesh and Maa (wife of Babaji) witness that boy shaking his head to the camera and washing his jata. Babaji saluted him and then camera moved pointing to other place.

Second Instance : Many saints during Kumbh Mela 2016, claim to visit and spiritual guided by Dabral baba at periodically at different instances. Baba himself wanted to visit Pilot Baba. While sitting in deep communion with him, he again showed his close ones pointing to white foreigner lady walking in the crowd with a bag on her shoulder made of cloth, they both together acknowledge that she is Mahavtar Babaji visiting in womanly body in ujjain for the bath and prasad and went back in communion.

Third Instance : In 2015, he was sick on his bed, wasn't able to walk, couldn't visit temple regularly because of his swelling on legs and deep pain in aging body, he said I requested Mahavtaar Babaji that I want to do puja ritual, at Bhairav Jayanti. Babaji told him back 'Kal Tumhe hum 25 saal ka bana denge' (ill make you 25 years old tomorrow). Babaji said at morning he felt in different body of youth, he walked by himself to perform puja all day and yagna. He said while in puja, baba himself was present there and he regained his body when at bed after baba was with him.

Selfless Guru 
During Kumbh Mela (2016) in Ujjain, majority of spiritually enlighten yogi from all part of India and great Himalayas acknowledge his as param-avatar, assuring he is one who received direct guidance from Mahavatar Babaji and known to jointly visit him physically and spiritually to seek guidance and bowed down in his honor of visiting him.

Every day he used meet people average (~250 people) at his residence seeking for his blessings to redress their sufferings and spiritual guidance. Babaji used to address visitor by their name as they walk in, talk about their problem without them sharing. Dabral baba often link it back saying  ‘baba bol rahe’ (His master is saying) addressing to his spiritual master and treating himself as mediator.

Babaji never sought popularity, known for childlike attitude and total self-less guru who reflected the guidance of thee through his body always state in deep sub-conscious meditative communion with higher bodies. His simplicity, selflessness and compassionate demeanor and equality for all managed to attract many people from the nation and abroad. Babaji never took anything from visitors and any donation he received in his temple went back to serve devotee as prasad. He always pray on behalf of visitor for their problems, he was true master who demonstrate selfless spirit that visited earth as drop of the divine.

References 

1932 births
2016 deaths
Indian Hindu yogis